is a passenger railway station in the city of Yachiyo, Chiba, Japan, operated by the third sector railway operator Tōyō Rapid Railway.

Lines

Station layout 
The station has dual opposed elevated side platforms, with a station building underneath.

Platforms

History
Yachiyo-Chūō Station was opened on April 27, 1996.

Passenger statistics
In fiscal 2018, the station was used by an average of 23,944 passengers daily.

Surrounding area
 Yachiyo City Hall

See also
 List of railway stations in Japan

References

External links

 Tōyō Rapid Railway Station information  

Railway stations in Japan opened in 1996
Railway stations in Chiba Prefecture
Yachiyo, Chiba